The men's 200 metre breaststroke was a swimming event held as part of the swimming at the 1912 Summer Olympics programme. It was the second appearance of the event, which had been introduced in 1908. Germany swept the medals in the event. The competition was held from Sunday July 7, 1912 to Friday July 12, 1912.

Twenty-four swimmers from eleven nations competed.

Records

These were the standing world and Olympic records (in minutes) prior to the 1912 Summer Olympics.

The Germans also took the Olympic record, with Lützow breaking it in the first heat and Bathe then proceeding to set it even higher each of the three times he raced. His gold medal winning time in the final, 3:01.8, stood as the Olympic record at the end.

Results

Quarterfinals

The top two in each heat advanced along with the fastest loser overall.

Quarterfinal 1

Quarterfinal 2

Quarterfinal 3

Quarterfinal 4

Quarterfinal 5

Quarterfinal 6

Semifinals

The top two from each heat and the faster of the two third place swimmers advanced.

Semifinal 1

Semifinal 2

Final

References

Notes
 
 

Swimming at the 1912 Summer Olympics
Men's events at the 1912 Summer Olympics